Minnesota Hockey is the statewide governing body of amateur hockey in Minnesota and an affiliate of USA Hockey. Since 1947, Minnesota Hockey (formerly known as the Minnesota Amateur Hockey Association or MAHA) has been providing volunteer services for the development and promotion of all youth hockey in Minnesota. Robert Ridder was the founding president of the MAHA, and affiliated the state group with the Amateur Hockey Association of the United States.

Districts
District 1
Dino Mights
Edgcumbe Hockey Association
City of Lakes Youth Hockey Association
Langford Park Hockey
District 2
Forest Lake
 Highland/Central Hockey Association
Mahtomedi
Mounds VIew
North St. Paul
Roseville
Stillwater
Tartan
White Bear Lake
District 3
 Armstrong/Cooper Youth Hockey New Hope
Crow River
Hopkins
 Minneapolis Storm
 Mound/Westonka
 North Metro Youth Hockey
Orono
 Osseo/Maple Grove Hockey Association
St. Louis Park
Wayzata
District 4
Fairmont
Luverne
Marshall
Redwood Falls, Minnesota
Sleepy Eye, Minnesota
Windom
Worthington
District 5
 Becker/Big Lake
Buffalo
Hutchinson
Litchfield/Dassel/Cokato
 Richmond
Sartell
Sauk Rapids
St. Cloud
St. Michael/Albertville
Monticello/Annandale/ Maple Lake
Willmar
District 6
Bloomington Jefferson
Bloomington Kennedy
Burnsville
Chaska
Eastview
Eden Prairie
Edina
Minnetonka
Prior Lake/Savage
Richfield
Shakopee
Waconia
District 8
Apple Valley
Cottage Grove
Dodge County
Eagan
 Eastview Hockey Association
Farmington
Hastings
Inver Grove Heights
 Johnson/Como HOckey Association
Lakeville
Rosemount
 Sibley Area Youth Hockey
South St. Paul
Woodbury
District 9
Albert Lea
Austin
 Dodge County Youth Hockey
Faribault
La Crescent
Mankato
Montgomery
New Ulm
Northfield
Owatonna
Red Wing
Rochester
St. Peter
Waseca
Winona
District 10
Andover
Anoka
Blaine
Cambridge/Isanti
Circle Pines
Champlin Park
Chisago Lakes
Coon Rapids
Elk River
Hinckley
Mora
North Branch
Pine City
Princeton
Rogers
Spring Lake Park
St. Francis
District 11
Carlton
Cook County
Duluth
Carlton
Hermantown
Moose Lake
Proctor
Silver Bay
Saginaw
Two Harbors
District 12
Ely
Eveleth
Grand Rapids
Coleraine
Hibbing/Chisholm
International Falls
Hoyt Lakes
Virginia
District 15
Alexandria
Benson
Brainerd
Crosby/Ironton/Aitkin
Detroit Lakes
Fergus Falls
Walker
Little Falls
Long Prairie
Moorhead
Morris
Park Rapids
Pequot Lakes
Perham
Sauk Centre
Wadena
District 16
Bagley
Bemidji
Blackduck
Crookston
East Grand Forks
Hallock
Baudette
Red Lake Falls
Roseau
Thief River Falls
Warroad

Disabled Hockey
Minnesota Hockey also governs Disabled Hockey.
Sled Hockey
Special Hockey
Amputee Hockey

References

External links
Minnesota Hockey Official Site
Hockey Fundraising Hockey Fundraising Site

Ice hockey in Minnesota
1947 establishments in Minnesota
Sports organizations established in 1947